MILF pornography (short for mother I'd like/love to fuck) is a genre of pornography in which the actresses are usually women ages 30 to 60, though many actresses have started making this type of pornographic film at age 25. Central to the typical MILF narrative is an age-play dynamic of older women and younger lovers of any gender. A related term is cougar, which implies an older woman is acting as a predator.

Overview
Actresses of the MILF porn genre have their own awards: the X-Rated Critics Organization "MILF of the Year Award", the AVN "MILF/Cougar Performer of the Year Award", and the Urban X Award for "Best MILF Performer" among others. In Japan, Sky PerfecTV! Adult Broadcasting Awards also has an award for the "Best Mature Actress".

In the UK, the term yummy mummy is used as well as MILF. Oxford Dictionaries defines a yummy mummy as "an attractive and stylish young mother".

History
The term MILF was first documented in Internet newsgroups during the 1990s. The earliest known online reference is a 1995 Usenet post about a Playboy pictorial of attractive mothers.  It was popularized by the 1999 film American Pie referring to Jennifer Coolidge's character, "Stifler's mom".

Notable performers

See also
 Age disparity in sexual relationships

References

 
Pornography by genre

pt:MILF#Pornografia MILF